Amblyzancla is a genus of moths of the family Yponomeutidae.

Species
Amblyzancla araeoptila - Turner, 1938 

Monotypic moth genera
Yponomeutidae
Noctuoidea genera